Talagang–Chakwal Road (Punjabi) is a provincially maintained highway in Punjab that extends from Talagang to Chakwal. The route is generally rural, passing near several communities including Balkassar. The eastern terminus at Talagang ends at Traffic Chowk with Talagang-Mianwali Road and Talagang–Fateh Jang Road while the eastern terminus at Chakwal ends at Tehsil Chowk with Mandra Chakwal Road and Chakwal-Jhelum Road. Note that road section from Mianwali to Balkassar has been handed over to National Highway Athuority. Now this road has been number N 130.

See also
 Provincial Highways of Punjab
 Roads in Pakistan

References

Highways in Punjab
Roads in Punjab, Pakistan
Chakwal District